Stawiszyn may refer to the following places:
Stawiszyn in Greater Poland Voivodeship (west-central Poland)
Stawiszyn, Gostyń County in Greater Poland Voivodeship (west-central Poland)
Stawiszyn, Masovian Voivodeship (east-central Poland)